Scorcha is the eighth studio album by Jamaican dancehall artist Sean Paul, released on 27 May 2022 through Island Records. It features collaborations with Gwen Stefani, Shenseea, Stylo G, Damian Marley, Nicky Jam, Tove Lo, Jada Kingdom, Pia Mia and Ty Dolla Sign.

Scorcha debuted at number 6 on the US Billboard Reggae Albums with 1,700 album equivalent units. The album would also receive a Grammy nomination for Best Reggae Album at the 65th Annual Grammy Awards.

Critical reception
Kyann-Sian Williams of NME gave the album a positive review with a 4-star rating, calling it "pop-accented bops from the Godfather of Dancehall", also praising the sound of the album by stating "he proves his hitmaking skills and why he still is the pioneer of island pop."

Track listing

Charts

References

2022 albums
Sean Paul albums